Joseph Farrell (1 July 1905 – 24 November 1999) was an Irish Fianna Fáil politician. He was elected to Seanad Éireann in 1961 on the Labour Panel and was re-elected to the Seanad in 1965 and 1969. 

Farrell was elected to Dáil Éireann as a Fianna Fáil Teachta Dála (TD) for the Louth constituency at the 1973 general election and was re-elected at the 1977 general election. He did not contest the 1981 general election.

References

1905 births
1999 deaths
Fianna Fáil TDs
Local councillors in County Louth
Members of the 10th Seanad
Members of the 11th Seanad
Members of the 12th Seanad
Members of the 20th Dáil
Members of the 21st Dáil
Politicians from County Louth
Fianna Fáil senators